Liam Irwin is a former Gaelic football player with Laois in Ireland.

Nicknamed "George", he played at midfield and in 1986 was part of the Laois team that won the county's second National Football League title.

Liam also picked up an All-Star award that year.

In 1992, Liam won his only Laois Senior Football Championship title with his club Ballyroan.

 1 Leinster Under 21 Football Championship 1982
 1 National Football League Division 1 1986
 1 All Star 1986
 1 Laois Senior Football Championship 1992

References
 Comhairle Laighean 1900-2000 Tom Ryall, 2000
 Complete Handbook of Gaelic Games Raymond Smith, 1999
 Laois GAA Yearbook 1999 Leinster Express, 1999

Living people
Laois inter-county Gaelic footballers
Ballyroan Gaelic footballers
Year of birth missing (living people)
Place of birth missing (living people)